HMS L16 was a L-class submarine built for the Royal Navy during World War I. The boat survived the war and was sold for scrap in 1934.

Design and description
L9 and its successors were enlarged to accommodate 21-inch (53.3 cm) torpedoes and more fuel. They displaced  on the surface and  submerged. The L-class submarines had a crew of 35 officers and ratings.

For surface running, the boats were powered by two 12-cylinder Vickers  diesel engines, each driving one propeller shaft. When submerged each propeller was driven by a  electric motor. They could reach  on the surface and  underwater.

The boats were armed with four 21-inch torpedo tubes in the bow and two 18-inch (45 cm) in broadside mounts. They carried four reload torpedoes for the 21-inch tubes for a grand total of ten torpedoes of all sizes. They were also armed with a  deck gun.

Construction and career
HMS L16 was laid down on 1 September 1917 by Fairfield at their Govan shipyard, launched on 9 April 1918, and completed on 31 May. During the war, the boat operated from Harwich or Teesport. HMS L16 was sold in February 1934 to Malcolm Brechin, Granton, Edinburgh.

Notes

References
 
 
 
 

 

British L-class submarines
Ships built in Govan
1918 ships
World War I submarines of the United Kingdom
Royal Navy ship names